Warren Stanley "Craig" "Rusty"  Slocum (November 14, 1934 – September 12, 1978) was an American character actor. He was best known for his roles of Noah Gifford and Harry Johnson on the television series Dark Shadows, which was broadcast on ABC.

Early life

Craig was the son of Dr. Samuel A. Slocum and Rose Gottlieb Slocum, who were immigrants from Poland and/or Russia; census records differ as to who came from which. The family resided in the Bronx, Assembly District 2, of New York City.  Craig had an older sister named Marilynn H. Slocum. According to census records, one of the parents had a teenage sister-in-law, Ann Rice, who resided with the Slocums for a time as well in the 1930s.

Craig also went by the name of Rusty from an early age, due to his red hair. He is known to have been friends with James Dean and his group in the early 1950s, according to several biographies, where he is referred to as Rusty Slocum. Craig is quoted speaking about Dean in The James Dean Story: A Myth-shattering Biography of an Icon by Ronald Martinetti.

Craig acted in a variety of small and uncredited roles in theatre, television, and film, starting in late 1949 or early 1950. He used a number of different names, Warren Slocum, Rusty Slocum, Craig Slocum. Some of Craig Slocum's uncredited appearances were on Colgate Playhouse, Mr. Peepers, Father Knows Best, Playhouse 90, Climax, and Gunsmoke.

In October 1977, Craig Slocum wrote that he was starting work in North Carolina as a lead for an army training film as "a captain." He wrote that it would not do much for his "career," but that he appreciated the money. It is possible Craig continued to work in other industrial films.

Slocum, who had type 2 diabetes, died from insulin shock at age 43. His social security death index lists his name under Rusty Slocum. His place of burial is not publicly known.

Filmography

References

External links

 
 
 

American male film actors
American male stage actors
American male television actors
Deaths from diabetes
Male actors from New York City
1934 births
1978 deaths
20th-century American male actors